A Family Affair is a Nero Wolfe detective novel published by the Viking Press in 1975. It is the last Nero Wolfe book written by Rex Stout who died less than six months after the publication of the book.

Plot summary
A waiter at Rusterman's Restaurant turns up at Wolfe's front door late one night, claiming that a man is going to kill him. Shortly after Archie puts him in one of the spare bedrooms, the waiter dies when a bomb planted in his coat pocket explodes. Wolfe, outraged at the thought of such a violent act taking place in his own house, resolves to find the murderer without sharing any information with Inspector Cramer. Soon Wolfe and Archie find themselves investigating two additional murders: the earlier killing of a customer at Rusterman's, and the subsequent death of the waiter's daughter.

For much of the story, Stout leads the reader to believe that the central murder mystery is related to the Watergate scandal. Ultimately, Wolfe discovers that the killer is one of his closest associates, a character who had been appearing in Nero Wolfe mysteries for over forty years.

A Family Affair is an unusual Nero Wolfe mystery in that Archie reveals his (correct) opinion of the killer's identity well before Wolfe does so in the closing chapters.

Reviews and commentary
Time reviewer J.F. Powers gave the book a favorable review, indicating that "even veteran aficionados will be hypnotized by this witty, complex mystery."

Publication history
1975, New York: The Viking Press, May 1975, hardcover
In his limited-edition pamphlet, Collecting Mystery Fiction #10, Rex Stout's Nero Wolfe Part II, Otto Penzler describes the first edition of A Family Affair: "Blue boards, black cloth spine; front and rear covers blank; spine stamped with gold and blue foil. Issued in a mainly black dust wrapper."
In April 2006, Firsts: The Book Collector's Magazine estimated that the first edition of A Family Affair had a value of between $60 and $100. The estimate is for a copy in very good to fine condition in a like dustjacket.
1975, New York: Viking (Mystery Guild), November 1975, hardcover
The far less valuable Viking book club edition may be distinguished from the first edition in three ways:
 The dust jacket has "Book Club Edition" printed on the inside front flap, and the price is absent (first editions may be price clipped if they were given as gifts).
 Book club editions are sometimes thinner and often taller (usually by a quarter of an inch) than first editions.
 Book club editions are bound in cardboard, and hardcover first editions are typically bound in cloth (or have at least a cloth spine).
1976, London: Collins Crime Club, 1976, hardcover
1976, New York: Bantam #02614-3, September 1976, paperback
1976, London: Fontana #4339, 1976, paperback
1976, London: Book Club Associates, 1976
1993, New York: Bantam Crimeline  January 1, 1993, paperback
2006, Auburn, California: The Audio Partners Publishing Corp., Mystery Masters  January 9, 2006, audio CD (unabridged, read by Michael Prichard)
2011, New York: Bantam Crimeline  August 17, 2011, e-book

References

External links

1975 American novels
Nero Wolfe novels by Rex Stout
Viking Press books
Works about the Watergate scandal